OFK Niš is a football club based in Niš, Serbia. They compete in the Zone League Centre, the fourth tier of the national league system.

History
Founded in 1969, the club made its Second League of FR Yugoslavia debut in the 1999–2000 season, placing fifth in Group East. They achieved their best result by finishing as runners-up in 2004. After that, the club would remain in the second tier for two more years until 2006. They subsequently spent two seasons in the Serbian League East from 2006 to 2008, before suffering relegation to the Niš Zone League. In 2019, the club marked its 50th anniversary.

Honours
Serbian League Niš (Tier 3)
 1998–99
Niš First League (Tier 5)
 2016–17

Notable players
This is a list of players who have played at full international level.
  Timothy Batabaire
For a list of all OFK Niš players with a Wikipedia article, see :Category:OFK Niš players.

References

External links
 Club page at Srbijasport

1969 establishments in Serbia
Association football clubs established in 1969
Football clubs in Serbia
Sport in Niš